A Ottoman invasion of Persia took place in 1906 on the orders of the vali of Baghdad.  On 23 May, the Ottomans occupied Behik in Bradest. By the end of May, Ottoman troops had occupied parts of Dasht and Mergaver districts, but not the settlement of Mergaver itself. By the 13th of June, the Ottomans had occupied Serdasht and Bani. Citizens of Khanakin were forced to take Ottoman passports and enlist in the Ottoman army. 500 mounted Ottoman troops marched from Baneh into the Persian Luristan country and the districts of Seifi, Malkhatavi and Baghasi, burning crops along the way. On 24 August, After protests were given by the Persian government, the Ottoman commander at Ban said he had no order to withdraw, and 2 days later the Ottomans were collecting Taxes near Urumia. On 8 September, the Ottomans occupied Gangatchin and the district of Baradosl. Ottoman troops subsequently occupied a strip of territory extending from a point south-west of Soujboulak to a point west of Khoi. On 3 August 1907, Mergaver was occupied and 3 days later the Ottomans threatened Urmia. The Ottomans were eventually expelled from Persia by the Russian Imperial Army in 1911.

References 

Wars involving the Ottoman Empire
Conflicts in 1906
1906 in Iran
Military history of Qajar Iran
Iran–Ottoman Empire relations